Deep In View is the debut studio album by Canadian post-punk band Cola. It was released on May 20, 2022, via Fire Talk Records, and written by former Ought members Tim Darcy and Ben Stidworthy.

Background 
In 2019, Darcy and Stidworthy started collaborating with Toronto-based drummer Evan Cartwright, whom they met frequently on tour. In 2020, during the COVID-19 pandemic, the band wrote a collection of songs that would eventually become Deep In View. In November 2021, on the same day Ought announced its disbandment, Darcy, Stidworthy, and Cartwright revealed their new band, Cola, and released a new single, "Blank Curtain." In February 2022, Fire Talk Records formally announced Deep In View, providing the full tracklist and releasing a second single, "So Excited." The label said the album takes its name from a 1965 anthology of interviews with British philosopher Alan Watts.

Deep In View was officially released on  May 20, 2022.

Critical reception 

Deep In View received positive acclaim upon its release. On Metacritic, which assigns a normalized score out of 100 to ratings from publications, the album received a mean score of 81 based on 4 reviews, indicating "universal acclaim."

Chris Gee, writing for Exclaim!, praised the album's "willingness to lean into [the band's] instinct for melody."  He added that, compared to Ought's "sprawling abandon and explosive spontaneity, Cola keep it more succinct and lock in their adrenaline right from the get-go."

Daniel Dylan Wray, of Uncut Magazine, also praised the album, calling the album's single, "Blank Curtain," an "infectious opener, as punchy as it is loosely unfurling, with rolling bass, gentle licks of melody and layered guitar coalescing into a radiating hum."

AllMusic's Fred Thomas wrote the album is "a sturdy, engaging, and highly listenable debut that feels less like a continuation of Ought and more like a new path branching off some of their best work."

Pitchfork's Jesse Locke scored the album a 7.3 out of 10, writing the band "haven't reinvented the wheel, but these subtle experiments suggest they still have boundaries to push."

Track listing

Personnel

Musicians 

 Tim Darcy – lead vocals, guitar
 Ben Stidworthy – bass, guitar, keyboard
 Evan Cartwright  – drums, supercollider, guitar

Technical 

 Valentin Ignat – recording
 Gabe Wax – mixing
 Harris Newman – mastering
 Katrijn Oelbrandt  – artwork and layout

References 

2022 debut albums
Post-punk albums by Canadian artists